Fred Jarvis McConnell (September 29, 1883 in Waseca, Minnesota – November 21, 1962 in Los Angeles) was an associate producer of Frank Buck's movie Tiger Fangs.

Early career
McConnell studied at the University of Wisconsin, and worked for the Chicago American and the Cleveland News. He worked in advertising with Kaufman & Handy and other Chicago agencies, and entered films in 1923 as manager of serial production at Universal Pictures. In 1926 he was an independent producer of Western and dog features for Pathé. He was eastern sales manager for The March of Time and joined the Columbia Pictures short subject sales department in 1936. Among the films he worked on: The Fighting Ranger, The Last Frontier, and The Return of the Riddle Rider.

Work with Frank Buck
In 1944, McConnell was associate producer of the Frank Buck film Tiger Fangs.

References

External links
 

1883 births
1962 deaths
University of Wisconsin–Madison alumni
People from Waseca, Minnesota
American male screenwriters
Screenwriters from Minnesota
Film producers from Minnesota
20th-century American male writers
20th-century American screenwriters